Elvin is a surname. Notable people with the surname include:

Sir Arthur Elvin MBE (1899–1957), Chairman of Wembley Stadium, speedway promoter
Herbert Henry Elvin (1874–1949), British trade unionist
Joe Elvin (1862–1935), Cockney comedian and music hall entertainer, Founder of the Grand Order of Water Rats
Lionel Elvin (1905–2005), eminent educationist
Mark Elvin (born 1938), professor emeritus of Chinese history at Australian National University

See also
Elvin, distributed event routing service using a publish/subscribe event delivery model
Elvin (given name)